Grundy County is a county located in the U.S. state of Missouri. As of the 2020 census, the population was 9,808. Its county seat is Trenton. The county was organized January 2, 1841, from part of Livingston County, Missouri and named after U.S. Attorney General Felix Grundy.

Geography

Adjacent counties
Mercer County (north)
Sullivan County (east)
Linn County (southeast)
Livingston County (south)
Daviess County (southwest)
Harrison County (northwest)

Major highways
 U.S. Route 65
 Route 6
 Route 146
 Route 190

Demographics

As of the 2010 census, there were 10,261 people, 4,204 households, and 2,694 families residing in the county.  The population density was 23.43 people per square mile (9/km2).  There were 5,023 housing units at an average density of 11.47 per square mile (4.43/km2).  The racial makeup of the county was 96.94% White, 0.57% Black or African American, 0.42% Native American, 0.36% Asian, 0.03% Pacific Islander, 6.53% from other races, and 1.02% from two or more races. Approximately 1.73% of the population were Hispanic or Latino of any race.

There were 4,204 households, out of which 28.28% had children under the age of 18 living with them, 51.05% were married couples living together, 8.68% had a female householder with no husband present, and 35.92% were non-families. 31.14% of all households were made up of individuals, and 15.37% had someone living alone who was 65 years of age or older.  The average household size was 2.36 and the average family size was 2.94.

In the county, the population was spread out, with 24.04% under the age of 18, 9.27% from 18 to 24, 20.29% from 25 to 44, 25.93% from 45 to 64, and 20.47% who were 65 years of age or older.  The median age was 41.6 years. For every 100 females there were 91.22 males.  For every 100 females age 18 and over, there were 91.03 males.

The median income for a household in the county was $35,239, and the median income for a family was $45,959. Males had a median income of $31,843 versus $25,231 for females. The per capita income for the county was $18,148.  About 10.2% of families and 13.3% of the population were below the poverty line, including 13.4% of those under age 18 and 16.7% of those age 65 or over.

Religion
According to the Association of Religion Data Archives County Membership Report (2010), Grundy County is sometimes regarded as being on the northern edge of the Bible Belt, with evangelical Protestantism being the majority religion. The most predominant denominations among residents in Grundy County who adhere to a religion are Southern Baptists (49.86%), United Methodists (13.51%), and Disciples of Christ (6.95%).

2020 Census

Education

Public schools
Grundy County R-V School District – Galt
Grundy County Elementary School (K-06)
Grundy County High School (07-12)
Laredo R-I School District – Laredo
Laredo Elementary School (K-08)
Pleasant View R-VI School District – Trenton
Pleasant View Elementary School (PK-08)
Spickard R-II School District – Spickard
Spickard Elementary School (PK-08)
Trenton R-IX School District – Trenton
Rissler Elementary School (PK-04)
Trenton Middle School (05-08)
Trenton High School (09-12)

Private schools
Pleasant Hill School – Jamesport (02-09) – Amish

Public libraries
Grundy County Jewett Norris Library

Politics

Local
The Republican Party predominantly controls politics at the local level in Grundy County. Republicans hold all of the elected positions in the county.

State

All of Grundy County is a part of Missouri's 7th District in the Missouri House of Representatives and is represented by Rusty Black (R-Chillicothe).

All of Grundy County is a part of Missouri's 12th District in the Missouri Senate and is currently represented by Dan Hegeman (R-Cosby).

Federal
All of Grundy County is included in Missouri's 6th Congressional District and is currently represented by Sam Graves (R-Tarkio) in the U.S. House of Representatives. Graves was elected to an eleventh term in 2020 over Democratic challenger Gena Ross.

Grundy County, along with the rest of the state of Missouri, is represented in the U.S. Senate by Josh Hawley (R-Columbia) and Roy Blunt (R-Strafford).

Blunt was elected to a second term in 2016 over then-Missouri Secretary of State Jason Kander.

Political culture

At the presidential level, Grundy County is reliably Republican. Like many of the rural counties throughout Missouri, Donald Trump carried the county easily in 2016 and 2020. Bill Clinton was the last Democratic presidential nominee to carry Grundy County in 1996 with a plurality of the vote, and a Democrat hasn't won majority support from the county's voters in a presidential election since Lyndon Johnson in 1964.

Like most rural areas throughout northern Missouri, voters in Grundy County generally adhere to socially and culturally conservative principles which tend to influence their Republican leanings. In 2004, Missourians voted on a constitutional amendment to define marriage as the union between a man and a woman—it overwhelmingly won in Grundy County with 77% of the vote. The initiative passed the state with 71% support from voters. In 2006, Missourians voted on a constitutional amendment to fund and legalize embryonic stem cell research in the state—it failed in Grundy County with 55% voting against the measure. The initiative narrowly passed the state with 51% of support from voters as Missouri became one of the first states in the nation to approve embryonic stem cell research. Despite Grundy County's longstanding tradition of supporting socially conservative platforms, voters in the county have a penchant for advancing populist causes like increasing the minimum wage. In 2006, Missourians voted on a proposition (Proposition B) to increase the minimum wage in the state to $6.50 an hour—it passed Grundy County with 61% of the vote. The proposition strongly passed every single county in Missouri with 79% voting in favor. (During the same election, voters in five other states also strongly approved increases in the minimum wage.) In 2018, Missourians voted on a proposition (Proposition A) concerning right to work, the outcome of which ultimately reversed the right to work legislation passed in the state the previous year. 63.53% of Grundy County voters cast their ballots to overturn the law.

Missouri presidential preference primaries

2020
The 2020 presidential primaries for both the Democratic and Republican parties were held in Missouri on March 10. On the Democratic side, former Vice President Joe Biden (D-Delaware) both won statewide and carried Grundy County by a wide margin. Biden went on to defeat President Donald Trump in the general election.

Incumbent President Donald Trump (R-Florida) faced a primary challenge from former Massachusetts Governor Bill Weld, but won both Grundy County and statewide by large margins.

2016
The 2016 presidential primaries for both the Republican and Democratic parties were held in Missouri on March 15. Businessman Donald Trump (R-New York) narrowly won the state overall, but received majority support in Grundy County.

On the Democratic side, former Secretary of State Hillary Clinton (D-New York) won statewide by a slim margin, but Senator Bernie Sanders (I-Vermont) carried Grundy County.

2012
The 2012 Missouri Republican Presidential Primary's results were nonbinding on the state's national convention delegates. Voters in Grundy County supported former U.S. Senator Rick Santorum (R-Pennsylvania), who finished first in the state at large, but eventually lost the nomination to former Governor Mitt Romney (R-Massachusetts). Delegates to the congressional district and state conventions were chosen at a county caucus, which selected delegations favoring U.S. Representative Ron Paul (R-Texas). Incumbent President Barack Obama easily won the Missouri Democratic Primary and renomination. He defeated Romney in the general election.

2008
In 2008, the Missouri Republican Presidential Primary was closely contested, with Senator John McCain (R-Arizona) prevailing and eventually winning the nomination.

Then-Senator Hillary Clinton (D-New York) received more votes than any candidate from either party in Grundy County during the 2008 presidential primary. Despite initial reports that Clinton had won Missouri, Barack Obama (D-Illinois), also a Senator at the time, narrowly defeated her statewide and later became that year's Democratic nominee, going on to win the presidency.

Communities

Cities
Galt
Laredo
Spickard
Tindall
Trenton (county seat)

Village
Brimson

Census-designated places
Edinburg
Leisure Lake

Unincorporated communities

Alpha
Buttsville
Dunlap
Hickory Creek
Lindley
Shott

Townships
Source

Franklin
Harrison
Jackson
Jefferson
Liberty
Lincoln
Madison
Marion
Myers 
Taylor
Trenton
Washington
Wilson

Notable people
Enoch Crowder, U.S. Army general and Ambassador to Cuba
Roy Gardner, bank robber
Arthur M. Hyde, Governor of Missouri (1921-1925), U.S. Secretary of Agriculture (1929-1933)
Yank Lawson, Dixieland trumpet player
Gregg Miller, inventor and author
Harold Leland “Hal” Call, LGBT rights activist, pornographer and publisher

See also
National Register of Historic Places listings in Grundy County, Missouri

References

External links
 http://www.grundycountymo.com - Grundy County Official Website
 Digitized 1930 Plat Book of Grundy County  from University of Missouri Division of Special Collections, Archives, and Rare Books

 
Missouri counties
1841 establishments in Missouri
Populated places established in 1841